Aly Keita (born 8 December 1986) is a professional footballer who plays a goalkeeper for Östersunds FK. Born in Sweden, he represents the Guinea national team.

Club career
Keita started his career at Skiljebo SK, before moving to Syrianska IF in 2007. Just before the 2012 season, Keita left Syrianska IF on a free transfer to Västerås SK.

Pitch invader incident
On 15 August 2016, Keita was attacked by a pitch invader during a game against Jönköpings Södra IF. In the closing of what would have been a 1–1 draw ended with an invader running onto the field and grabbed Keita. He later reported that during the confrontation, he was struck in the temple. After the incident, the 17-year old invader was arrested and the match was abandoned.

This was the second time a game in the Swedish top flight had been abandoned that year, with the first one being IFK Göteborg's match against Malmö in April.

International career
Keita was born in Sweden to a Guinean father and a Norwegian mother. He opted to represent the Guinea national football team in April 2018, and he received a call-up to the national team in October 2018. Keita made his debut for Guinea in a 2–0 2019 Africa Cup of Nations qualification win over Rwanda on 12 October 2018.

Career statistics

Club

International

Honours

Club 
Östersunds FK

 Svenska Cupen: 2016–17

References

External links
 
 
 

1986 births
Living people
Sportspeople from Västerås
Citizens of Guinea through descent
Guinean footballers
Guinea international footballers
Swedish footballers
Guinean people of Norwegian descent
Swedish people of Guinean descent
Swedish people of Norwegian descent
Association football goalkeepers
Västerås SK Fotboll players
Östersunds FK players
Allsvenskan players
Superettan players
Ettan Fotboll players
2019 Africa Cup of Nations players
2021 Africa Cup of Nations players